Gauld is a Scottish surname, originating from Aberdeenshire, and a sept of Clan MacDonald.

Famous Gaulds
 George Gauld (aviator) (died 1964), Canadian World War I flying ace
 George Gauld (surveyor) (1731–1782), British military engineer, cartographer and surveyor
 George Gauld (cricketer) (1873–1950), English cricketer
Jimmy Gauld, former Scottish footballer
Stuart Gauld, former Scottish footballer
Tom Gauld, Scottish illustrator and cartoonist
Ryan Gauld, Scottish footballer